Religieuse is a French pastry made of two choux pastry cases, one larger than the other, filled with crème pâtissière, most commonly chocolate or mocha. Each case is covered in a ganache of the same flavor as the filling, and then joined decorated with piped buttercream frosting.

The pastry, whose name means "nun", is supposed to represent the papal mitre. Religieuse itself was supposedly conceived in the mid-nineteenth century, but the first version of the batter was invented in 1540 by Popelini, the Florentine chef of the Florentine queen of France, Catherine de' Medici. After subsequent iterations, the batter finally took its current form in the early 19th century in the kitchens of Marie-Antoine Carême, "The King of Chefs and the Chef of Kings". Religieuse is a type of éclair.

See also
 
 
 List of choux pastry dishes
 List of French desserts

References

French pastries
Custard desserts
Choux pastry